The discography of Malcolm McLaren, English performer, impresario, self-publicist and former manager of the Sex Pistols and the New York Dolls, consists of eight studio albums, one compilation, one remix album, two soundtracks, two extended plays and eighteen singles.

Studio albums

Compilation albums

Remix albums

Soundtracks
 Carry On Columbus (1992) (as Fantastic Planet) – music written and produced by Malcolm McLaren and Lee Gorman, performed by Jayne Collins and Debbie Holmes
 LUST 2 – Seven Deadly Sins (1992) – Short film directed by Maria Beatty, original music by McLaren
 Catwalk (1996) – Documentary film directed by Robert Leacock, music written and produced by Malcolm McLaren and Lee Gorman

Extended plays

 Would Ya Like More Scratchin'? is a 1984 re-release of the 1983 US EP D'ya Like Scratchin'? that was strictly released in Europe and Canada and never made it to American shores. The revamped EP featured one more track (the title track, which served as a remix counterpart to the first track, "D'ya Like Scratchin'?") which was never released in the US and was never reissued on any other release or compilation.

Singles

Videos
 Duck Rock (VHS, RCA/Columbia Pictures Home Video, 1985)

Music videos
Note that the list is incomplete.

 "Buffalo Gals"
 "Soweto"
 "Double Dutch"
 "Duck for the Oyster"
 "Madam Butterfly (Un bel di vedremo)"
 "Waltz Darling"
 "Something's Jumpin' in Your Shirt"
 "Deep in Vogue"
 "House of the Blue Danube" (directed by Lez Barstow)
 "Paris Paris"

Contributions
 Jungk DEMO Tracks (1998) produced by Malcolm McLaren
 "Heather's Song" (2016) by Tommy MV$ERVTI co-produced by Malcolm McLaren (posthumously)

References

Rock music discographies
Pop music discographies
Electronic music discographies
Discographies of British artists